Platysace compressa, commonly known as the tapeworm plant, is a perennial herb that is endemic to Western Australia.

It blooms between September and March producing white to cream flowers. Found on sand dunes and on coastal limestone or granite hills and rocky outcrops it has a range along the south coast from the South West through the Great Southern to the Goldfields-Esperance region.

First described by the botanist J.J.H. de Labillardiere in 1805 as Azorella compressa in the work Novae Hollandiae Plantarum Specimen, it was later reclassified as Trachymene compressa by Kurt Polycarp Joachim Sprengel in 1818 in Species Umbelliferarum minus cognitae illustratae. It was finally added to the Platysace genera by C. Norman in 1939 in the Journal of Botany, British and Foreign.

References

compressa
Flora of Western Australia
Taxa named by Jacques Labillardière
Plants described in 1805